The 2014 Houston Astros season was the 53rd season for the franchise in Houston, their 50th as the Astros and their 15th season at Minute Maid Park.
The Astros failed to make the playoffs, but made a nineteen win improvement from the previous season, finishing 70-92. The Astros also avoided last place in the AL West, finishing three games ahead of the Rangers.  It was the first time since 2010 that the Astros did not finish in last place for their division, and featured the best overall season record since that season as well.

Regular season

Season standings

American League West

American League Wild Card

Record vs. opponents

Game log

|- style="background:#cfc; text-align:center;"
| 1 || April 1 || Yankees || 6–2 || Feldman (1–0) || Sabathia (0–1) ||  || 42,117 || 1–0
|- style="background:#cfc; text-align:center;"
| 2 || April 2 || Yankees || 3–1 || Cosart (1–0) || Kuroda (0–1) || Fields (1) || 23,145 || 2–0
|- style="background:#fcc; text-align:center;"
| 3 || April 3 || Yankees || 2–4 || Nova (1–0) || Oberholtzer (0–1) || Robertson (1) || 26,348 || 2–1
|- style="background:#fcc; text-align:center;"
| 4 || April 4 || Angels || 1–11 || Richards (1–0) || Harrell (0–1) || || 15,611 || 2–2
|- style="background:#fcc; text-align:center;"
| 5 || April 5 || Angels || 1–5 || Skaggs (1–0) || Keuchel (0–1) || || 28,515 || 2–3
|- style="background:#cfc; text-align:center;"
| 6 || April 6 || Angels || 7–4 || Feldman (2–0) || Weaver (0–2) || Qualls (1) || 14,786 || 3–3
|- style="background:#fcc; text-align:center;"
| 7 || April 7 || Angels || 1–9 || Wilson (1–0) || Cosart (1–1) || || 17,936 || 3–4
|- style="background:#fcc; text-align:center;"
| 8 || April 8 || @ Blue Jays || 2–5 || Buehrle (2–0) || Oberholtzer (0–2) || Santos (3) || 13,123 || 3–5
|- style="background:#fcc; text-align:center;"
| 9 || April 9 || @ Blue Jays || 3–7 || Morrow (1–1) || Harrell (0–2) || || 13,569 || 3–6
|- style="background:#cfc; text-align:center;"
| 10 || April 10 || @ Blue Jays || 6–4 || Keuchel (1–1) || Dickey (1–2) || Bass (1) || 15,788 || 4–6
|- style="background:#fcc; text-align:center;"
| 11 || April 11 || @ Rangers || 0–1 (10) || Frasor (1–0) || Peacock (0–1) || || 36,150 || 4–7
|- style="background:#cfc; text-align:center;"
| 12 || April 12 || @ Rangers || 6–5 (10) || Chapman (1–0) || Soria (1–1) || Bass (2) || 42,577 || 5–7
|- style="background:#fcc; text-align:center;"
| 13 || April 13 || @ Rangers || 0–1 || Pérez (2–0) || Oberholtzer (0–3) || Ogando (1) || 38,698 || 5–8
|- style="background:#fcc; text-align:center;"
| 14 || April 15 || Royals || 2–4 || Ventura (1–0) || Harrell (0–3) || Holland (4) || 29,778 || 5–9
|- style="background:#fcc; text-align:center;"
| 15 || April 16 || Royals || 4–6 (11) || Duffy (1–0) || Williams (0–1) || Holland (5) || 23,043 || 5–10
|- style="background:#fcc; text-align:center;"
| 16 || April 17 || Royals || 1–5 || Shields (1–2) || Feldman (2–1) || || 26,333 || 5–11
|- style="background:#fcc; text-align:center;"
| 17 || April 18 || @ Athletics || 3–11 || Gray (3–0) || Cosart (1–2) || || 18,234 || 5–12
|- style="background:#fcc; text-align:center;"
| 18 || April 19 || @ Athletics || 3–4 || Otero (3–0) || Qualls (0–1) || || 33,166 || 5–13
|- style="background:#fcc; text-align:center;"
| 19 || April 20 || @ Athletics || 1–4 || Chavez (1–0) || Peacock (0–2) || Gregerson (3) || 16,382 || 5–14
|- style="background:#cfc; text-align:center;"
| 20 || April 21 || @ Mariners || 7–2 || Keuchel (2–1) || Hernández (3–1) || || 14,630 || 6–14
|- style="background:#cfc; text-align:center;"
| 21 || April 22 || @ Mariners || 5–2 || McHugh (1–0) || Ramírez (1–3) || Fields (2) || 10,466 || 7–14
|- style="background:#fcc; text-align:center;"
| 22 || April 23 || @ Mariners || 3–5 || Rodney (1–1) || Fields (0–1) || || 13,739 || 7–15
|- style="background:#fcc; text-align:center;"
| 23 || April 24 || Athletics || 1–10 || Kazmir (3–0) || Oberholtzer (0–4) || || 19,987 || 7–16
|- style="background:#fcc; text-align:center;"
| 24 || April 25 || Athletics || 5–12 || Gregerson (1–1) || Fields (0–2) || || 17,708 || 7–17
|- style="background:#cfc; text-align:center;"
| 25 || April 26 || Athletics || 7–6 || Williams (1–1) || Doolittle (0–2) || Valdés (1) || 17,850 || 8–17
|- style="background:#cfc; text-align:center;"
| 26 || April 27 || Athletics || 5–1 || McHugh (2–0) || Milone (0–2) || || 18,935 || 9–17
|- style="background:#fcc; text-align:center;"
| 27 || April 29 || Nationals || 3–4 || Clippard (2–2) || Fields (0–3) || Soriano (5) || 23,394 || 9–18
|- style="background:#fcc; text-align:center;"
| 28 || April 30 || Nationals || 0–7 || Zimmermann (2–1) || Oberholtzer (0–5) || || 25,172 || 9–19
|-

|- style="background:#cfc; text-align:center;"
| 29 || May 2 || Mariners || 5–4 (11) || Bass (1–0) || Furbush (0–3) || || 15,771 || 10–19
|- style="background:#fcc; text-align:center;"
| 30 || May 3 || Mariners || 8–9 || Iwakuma (1–0) || Keuchel (2–2) || Rodney (7) || 15,798 || 10–20
|- style="background:#fcc; text-align:center;"
| 31 || May 4 || Mariners || 7–8 || Maurer (1–0) || McHugh (2–1) || Farquhar (1) || 24,996 || 10–21
|- style="background:#fcc; text-align:center;"
| 32 || May 5 || @ Tigers || 0–2 || Scherzer (4–1) || Cosart (1–3) || Nathan (6) || 26,457 || 10–22
|- style="background:#fcc; text-align:center;"
| 33 || May 6 || @ Tigers || 4–11 || Ray (1–0) || Oberholtzer (0–6) || || 27,939 || 10–23
|- style="background:#fcc; text-align:center;"
| 34 || May 7 || @ Tigers || 2–3 || Porcello (5–1) || Peacock (0–3) || Nathan (7) || 26,207 || 10–24
|- style="background:#cfc; text-align:center;"
| 35 || May 8 || @ Tigers || 6–2 || Keuchel (3–2) || Smyly (2–2) || || 35,643 || 11–24
|- style="background:#fcc; text-align:center;"
| 36 || May 9 || @ Orioles || 3–4 || Chen (4–2) || Williams (1–2) || Hunter (11) || 28,875 || 11–25
|- style="background:#fcc; text-align:center;"
| 37 || May 10 || @ Orioles || 4–5 (10) || Webb (2–0) || Clemens (0–1) || || 26,264 || 11–26
|- style="background:#cfc; text-align:center;"
| 38 || May 11 || @ Orioles || 5–2 || Cosart (2–3) || Tillman (3–2) || Qualls (2) || 45,944 || 12–26
|- style="background:#fcc; text-align:center;"
| 39 || May 12 || Rangers || 0–4 || Lewis (3–2) || Peacock (0–4) || || 14,617 || 12–27
|- style="background:#cfc; text-align:center;"
| 40 || May 13 || Rangers || 8–0 || Keuchel (4–2) || Harrison (1–1) || || 14,028 || 13–27
|- style="background:#cfc; text-align:center;"
| 41 || May 14 || Rangers || 5–4 || Qualls (1–1) || Martinez (0–1) || || 17,783 || 14–27
|- style="background:#fcc; text-align:center;"
| 42 || May 16 || White Sox || 2–7 || Quintana (2–3) || McHugh (2–2) || || 17,529 || 14–28
|- style="background:#cfc; text-align:center;"
| 43 || May 17 || White Sox || 6–5 || Cosart (3–3) || Noesí (0–4) || Qualls (3) || 20,612 || 15–28
|- style="background:#cfc; text-align:center;"
| 44 || May 18 || White Sox || 8–2 || Peacock (1–4) || Danks (3–4) || || 21,532 || 16–28
|- style="background:#cfc; text-align:center;"
| 45 || May 19 || @ Angels || 5–2 || Keuchel (5–2) || Richards (4–1) || || 33,150 || 17–28
|- style="background:#fcc; text-align:center;"
| 46 || May 20 || @ Angels || 3–9 || Skaggs (4–1) || Feldman (2–2) || || 30,150 || 17–29
|- style="background:#fcc; text-align:center;"
| 47 || May 21 || @ Angels || 1–2 || Weaver (5–3) || McHugh (2–3) || || 40,112 || 17–30
|- style="background:#fcc; text-align:center;"
| 48 || May 22 || @ Mariners || 1–3 || Leone (1–0) || Cosart (3–4) || Rodney (12) || 13,836 || 17–31
|- style="background:#fcc; text-align:center;"
| 49 || May 23 || @ Mariners || 1–5 || Hernández (6–1) || Owens (0–1) || || 21,192 || 17–32
|- style="background:#cfc; text-align:center;"
| 50 || May 24 || @ Mariners || 9–4 || Oberholtzer (1–6) || Maurer (1–3) || || 21,585 || 18–32
|-  style="background:#cfc; text-align:center;"
| 51 || May 25 || @ Mariners || 4–1 || Keuchel (6–2) || Iwakuma (3–1) || || 26,839 || 19–32
|-  style="background:#cfc; text-align:center;"
| 52 || May 26 || @ Royals || 9–2 || Feldman (3–2) || Ventura (2–5) || || 32,070 || 20–32
|-  style="background:#cfc; text-align:center;"
| 53 || May 27 || @ Royals || 3–0 || McHugh (3–3) || Guthrie (2–4) || || 17,826 || 21–32
|-  style="background:#cfc; text-align:center;"
| 54 || May 28 || @ Royals || 9–3 || Cosart (4–4) || Duffy (2–5) || || 16,220 || 22–32
|-  style="background:#cfc; text-align:center;"
| 55 || May 29 || Orioles || 3–1 || Fields (1–3) || Guilmet (0–1) || Qualls (4) || 22,884 || 23–32
|-  style="background:#cfc; text-align:center;"
| 56 || May 30 || Orioles || 2–1 || Oberholtzer (2–6) || González (3–4) || Qualls (5) || 38,482 || 24–32
|- style="background:#fcc; text-align:center;"
| 57 || May 31 || Orioles || 1–4 || Tillman (5–2) || Keuchel (6–3) || Britton (4) || 29,619 || 24–33
|-

|- style="background:#fcc; text-align:center;"
| 58 || June 1 || Orioles || 4–9 || Chen (6–2) || Feldman (3–3) ||  || 17,022 || 24–34
|-  style="background:#cfc; text-align:center;"
| 59 || June 3 || Angels || 7–2 || McHugh (4–3) || Wilson (6–5) ||  || 23,219 || 25–34
|-  style="background:#fcc; text-align:center;"
| 60 || June 4 || Angels || 0–4 || Richards (5–2) || Cosart (4–5) ||  || 23,902 || 25–35
|-  style="background:#cfc; text-align:center;"
| 61 || June 5 || Angels || 8–5 || Skaggs (4–4) || Peacock (2–4) || Qualls (6) || 24,672 || 26–35
|-  style="background:#cfc; text-align:center;"
| 62 || June 6 || @ Twins || 5–4 || Keuchel (7–3) || Hughes (6–2) || Qualls (7) || 29,448 || 27–35
|-  style="background:#fcc; text-align:center;"
| 63 || June 7 || @ Twins || 0–8 || Gibson (5–5) || Feldman (3–4) ||  || 27,732 || 27–36
|-  style="background:#cfc; text-align:center;"
| 64 || June 8 || @ Twins || 14–5 || Downs (1–0) || Deduno (2–4) ||  || 31,576 || 28–36
|-  style="background:#cfc; text-align:center;"
| 65 || June 9 || @ Diamondbacks || 4–3 || Cosart (5–5) || Collmenter (4–3) || Qualls (8) || 18,805 || 29–36
|-  style="background:#fcc; text-align:center;"
| 66 || June 10 || @ Diamondbacks || 1–4 || Arroyo (6–4) || Fields (1–4) || Reed (16) || 17,667 || 29–37
|-  style="background:#cfc; text-align:center;"
| 67 || June 11 || Diamondbacks || 5–1 || Keuchel (8–3) || McCarthy (1–9) ||  || 24,319 || 30–37
|-  style="background:#cfc; text-align:center;"
| 68 || June 12 || Diamondbacks || 5–4 (10) || Sipp (1–0) || Putz (1–1) ||  || 33,475 || 31–37
|-  style="background:#fcc; text-align:center;"
| 69 || June 13 || Rays || 1–6 || Cobb (2–4) || McHugh (4–4) ||  || 26,829 || 31–38
|-  style="background:#cfc; text-align:center;"
| 70 || June 14 || Rays || 7–3 || Cosart (6–5) || Archer (3–4) ||  || 26,264 || 32–38
|-  style="background:#fcc; text-align:center;"
| 71 || June 15 || Rays || 3–4 || Price (5–6) || Williams (1–3) || McGee (1) || 25,526 || 32–39
|-  style="background:#fcc; text-align:center;"
| 72 || June 17 || @ Nationals || 5–6 || Roark (6–4) || Keuchel (8–4) || Soriano (14) || 29,960 || 32–40
|-  style="background:#fcc; text-align:center;"
| 73 || June 18 || @ Nationals || 5–6 || Barrett (3–0) || Downs (1–1) || Soriano (15) || 25,453 || 32–41
|-  style="background:#fcc; text-align:center;"
| 74 || June 19 || @ Rays || 0–5 || Archer (4–4) || McHugh (4–5) ||  || 10,880 || 32–42
|-  style="background:#cfc; text-align:center;"
| 75 || June 20 || @ Rays || 3–1 || Cosart (7–5) || Price (5–7) || Qualls (9) || 13,861 || 33–42
|-  style="background:#fcc; text-align:center;"
| 76 || June 21 || @ Rays || 0–8 || Odorizzi (3–7) || Buchanan (0–1) ||  || 17,551 || 33–43
|-  style="background:#fcc; text-align:center;"
| 77 || June 22 || @ Rays || 2–5 || Oviedo (3–2) || Keuchel (8–5) || Peralta (1) || 18,841 || 33–44
|-  style="background:#fcc; text-align:center;"
| 78 || June 24 || Braves || 2–3 || Harang (6–6) || Feldman (3–5) || Kimbrel (22) || 18,912 || 33–45
|-  style="background:#fcc; text-align:center;"
| 79 || June 25 || Braves || 0–4 || Wood (6–6) || McHugh (4–6) ||  || 20,559 || 33–46
|-  style="background:#cfc; text-align:center;"
| 80 || June 26 || Braves || 6–1 || Cosart (8–5) || Minor (2–5) ||  || 24,474 || 34–46
|-   style="background:#cfc; text-align:center;"
| 81 || June 27 || Tigers || 4–3 (11) || Buchanan (1–1) || Hardy (0–1) ||  || 22,386 || 35–46
|-  style="background:#fcc; text-align:center;"
| 82 || June 28 || Tigers || 3–4 || Coke (1–1) || Williams (1–4) || Nathan (17) || 25,788 || 35–47
|-  style="background:#cfc; text-align:center;"
| 83 || June 29 || Tigers || 6–4 || Feldman (4–5) || Smyly (4–7) || Sipp (1) || 22,478 || 36–47
|-  style="background:#fcc; text-align:center;"
| 84 || June 30 || Mariners || 4–10 || Walker (1–0) || McHugh (4–7) || Wilhelmsen (1) || 17,340 || 36–48 
|-

|-  style="background:#fcc; text-align:center;"
| 85 || July 1 || Mariners || 2–13 || Iwakuma (6–4) || Cosart (8–6) || || 17,504 || 36–49
|-  style="background:#fcc; text-align:center;"
| 86 || July 2 || Mariners || 2–5 || Young (8–4) || Peacock  (2–5) || Rodney (24) || 17,209 || 36–50
|-  style="background:#fcc; text-align:center;"
| 87 || July 3 || @ Angels || 2–5 || Shoemaker (6–2) || Oberholtzer (2–7) || Smith (10) || 37,625 || 36–51
|-  style="background:#fcc; text-align:center;"
| 88 || July 4 || @ Angels || 6–7 || Smith (3–0) || Sipp (1–1) || || 43,557 || 36–52
|-  style="background:#fcc; text-align:center;"
| 89 || July 5 || @ Angels || 5–11 || Roth (1–0) || Bass (1–1) || || 40,479 || 36–53
|-  style="background:#fcc; text-align:center;"
| 90 || July 6 || @ Angels || 1–6 || Richards (10–2) || McHugh (4–8) || || 33,552 || 36–54
|-  style="background:#cfc; text-align:center;"
| 91 || July 7 || @ Rangers || 12–7 || Cosart (9–6) || Mikolas (0–1) || || 31,010 || 37–54
|-  style="background:#cfc; text-align:center;"
| 92 || July 8 || @ Rangers || 8–3 || Peacock (3–5) || Irwin (0–1) || || 32,608 || 38–54
|-  style="background:#cfc; text-align:center;"
| 93 || July 9 || @ Rangers || 8–4 || Keuchel (9–5) || Darvish (8–5) || || 31,161 || 39–54
|-  style="background:#fcc; text-align:center;"
| 94 || July 11 || Red Sox || 3–8 || Lackey (10–6) || Feldman (4–6) || || 27,264 || 39–55
|-  style="background:#cfc; text-align:center;"
| 95 || July 12 || Red Sox || 3–2 || Fields (2–4) || Peavy (1–8) || Qualls (10) || 26,322 || 40–55
|-  style="background:#fcc; text-align:center;"
| 96 || July 13 || Red Sox || 0–11 || Buchholz (4–5) || Peacock (3–6) || || 20,681 || 40–56
|-  style="background:#bbb;"
|colspan=9| All–Star Break (July 14–17)
|-  style="background:#fcc; text-align:center;"
| 97 || July 18 || @ White Sox || 2–3 || Webb (5–2) || Feldman (4–7) || Putnam (2) || 28,777 || 40–57
|-  style="background:#fcc; text-align:center;"
| 98 || July 19 || @ White Sox || 3–4 || Noesí (4–7) || Keuchel (9–6) || Putnam (2) || 28,210 || 40–58
|-  style="background:#cfc; text-align:center;"
| 99 || July 20 || @ White Sox || 11–7 || Sipp (2–1) || Webb (5–3) || || 26,256 || 41–58
|-  style="background:#cfc; text-align:center;"
| 100 || July 22 || @ Athletics || 3–2 (12) || Downs (2–1) || Abad (2–4) || Qualls (11) || 22,908 || 42–58
|-  style="background:#fcc; text-align:center;"
| 101 || July 23 || @ Athletics || 7–9 || Chavez (8–6) || Peacock (3–7) || Doolittle (15) || 28,310 || 42–59
|-  style="background:#fcc; text-align:center;"
| 102 || July 24 || @ Athletics || 1–13 || Samardzija (4–8) || Feldman (4–8) || || 22,759 || 42–60
|-  style="background:#fcc; text-align:center;"
| 103 || July 25 || Marlins || 0–2 || Hand (2–2) || Keuchel (9–7) || Cishek (25) || 23,132 || 42–61
|-  style="background:#fcc; text-align:center;"
| 104 || July 26 || Marlins || 3–7 || Koehler (7–7) || Cosart (9–7) || || 28,968 || 42–62
|-  style="background:#fcc; text-align:center;"
| 105 || July 27 || Marlins || 2–4 || Turner (4–6) || McHugh (4–9) || Cishek (26) || 17,858 || 42–63
|-  style="background:#cfc; text-align:center; "
| 106 || July 28 || Athletics || 7–3 || Oberholtzer (3–7) || Chavez (8–7) || || 18,259 || 43–63
|-  style="background:#fcc; text-align:center;"
| 107 || July 29 || Athletics || 4–7 || Scribner (1–0) || Qualls (1–2) || Doolittle (16) || 16,940 || 43–64
|-  style="background:#cfc; text-align:center;"
| 108 || July 30 || Athletics || 8–1 || Keuchel (10–7) || Hammel (8–9) || || 17,637 || 44–64
|-  style="background:#fcc; text-align:center;"
| 109 || July 31 || Blue Jays || 5–6 || Sanchez (2–0) || Qualls (1–3) || Janssen (18) || 17,423 || 44–65
|-

|-  style="background:#cfc; text-align:center;"
| 110 || August 1 || Blue Jays || 3–1 || Veras (1–0) || Loup (3–3) || Qualls (12) || 19,576 || 45–65
|-  style="background:#cfc; text-align:center;"
| 111 || August 2 || Blue Jays || 8–2 || Oberholtzer (4–7) || Dickey (9–11) || || 19,946 || 46–65
|-  style="background:#cfc; text-align:center;"
| 112 || August 3 || Blue Jays || 6–1 || Feldman (5–8) || Stroman (7–3) || || 19,932 || 47–65
|-  style="background:#fcc; text-align:center;"
| 113 || August 5 || @ Phillies || 1–2 (15) || Neris (1–0) || Buchanan (1–2) ||  || 28,336 || 47–66
|-  style="background:#fcc; text-align:center;"
| 114 || August 6 || @ Phillies || 3–10 || Buchanan (6–5) || Peacock (3–8) ||  || 26,691 || 47–67
|-  style="background:#fcc; text-align:center;"
| 115 || August 7 || @ Phillies || 5–6 || Hollands (2–1) || Sipp (2–2) || Papelbon (27) || 26,609 || 47–68
|-  style="background:#cfc; text-align:center;"
| 116 || August 8 || Rangers || 4–3 || Veras (2-0) || Cotts (2-6) || Qualls (13) || 24,256 || 48–68
|-  style="background:#cfc; text-align:center;"
| 117 || August 9 || Rangers || 8–3 || Feldman (6-8) || Darvish (10-7) || || 24,019 || 49–68
|-  style="background:#fcc; text-align:center;"
| 118 || August 10 || Rangers || 2–6 || Martinez (2-8) || Keuchel (10-8) || || 19,239 || 49–69
|-  style="background:#fcc; text-align:center;"
| 119 || August 11 || Twins || 2–4 || Duensing (3-2) || Fields (2-5) || Perkins (29) || 15,569 || 49–70
|-  style="background:#cfc; text-align:center;"
| 120 || August 12 || Twins || 10–4 || McHugh (5-9) || Pino (1-5) || || 17,490 || 50–70
|-  style="background:#fcc; text-align:center;"
| 121 || August 13 || Twins || 1–3 || Gibson (11-9) || Oberholtzer (4-8) || Perkins (30) || 16,480 || 50–71
|-  style="background:#fcc; text-align:center;"
| 122 || August 14 || @ Red Sox || 4–9 || Webster (3-1) || Feldman (6-9) || || 38,065 || 50–72
|-  style="background:#cfc; text-align:center;"
| 123 || August 15 || @ Red Sox || 5–3 (10)  || Sipp (3-2) || Breslow (2-4) || || 37,016 || 51–72
|-  style="background:#fcc; text-align:center;"
| 124 || August 16 || @ Red Sox || 7–10 || Wilson (1-0) || Fields (2-6) || || 37,652 || 51–73
|-  style="background:#cfc; text-align:center;"
| 125 || August 17 || @ Red Sox || 8–1 || McHugh (6-9) || Kelly (2-3) || || 36,717 || 52–73
|-  style="background:#cfc; text-align:center;"
| 126 || August 19 || @ Yankees || 7–4 || Fields (3-6) || Robertson (1-4) || Qualls (14) || 40,015 || 53–73
|-  style="background:#cfc; text-align:center;"
| 127 || August 20 || @ Yankees || 5–2 || Feldman (7-9) || Huff (2-1) || Veras (1) || 42,102 || 54–73
|-  style="background:#fcc; text-align:center;"
| 128 || August 21 || @ Yankees || 0–3 || McCarthy (8-12) || Keuchel (10-9) || || 41,767 || 54–74
|-  style="background:#cfc; text-align:center;"
| 129 || August 22 || @ Indians || 5–1 || Sipp (4-2) || Allen (4-3) || || 18,743 || 55–74
|-  style="background:#fcc; text-align:center;"
| 130 || August 23 || @ Indians || 2–3 || Allen (5-3) || Buchanan (1-3) || || 20,785 || 55–75
|-  style="background:#fcc; text-align:center;"
| 131 || August 24 || @ Indians || 1–3 || Bauer (5-7) || Oberholtzer (4-9) || Allen (17) || 17,123 || 55–76
|-  style="background:#fcc; text-align:center;"
| 132 || August 25 || Athletics || 2–8 || Samardziji (4-3) || Feldman (7-10) || || 14,094 || 55–77
|-  style="background:#cfc; text-align:center;"
| 133 || August 26 || Athletics || 4–2 || Fields (4-6) || Gregerson (3-3) || Qualls (15) || 17,345 || 56–77
|-  style="background:#fcc; text-align:center;"
| 134 || August 27 || Athletics || 4–5 || Otero (8-1) || Qualls (1-4) || O'Flaherty (1) || 14,791 || 56–78
|-  style="background:#cfc; text-align:center;"
| 135 || August 28 || Rangers || 4–2 || McHugh (7-9) || Mendez (0-1) || Sipp (2) || 16,399 || 57–78
|-  style="background:#fcc; text-align:center;"
| 136 || August 29 || Rangers || 6–13 || Baker (3-3) || Oberholtzer (4-10) || || 18,931 || 57–79
|-  style="background:#cfc; text-align:center;"
| 137 || August 30 || Rangers || 2–0 || Feldman (8-10) || Klein (0-2) || || 24,771 || 58–79
|-  style="background:#cfc; text-align:center;"
| 138 || August 31 || Rangers || 3–2 || Veras (3-0) || Cotts (2-8) || Qualls (16) || 19,024 || 59–79
|-

|-  style="background:#cfc; text-align:center;"
| 139 || September 2 || Angels || 8–3 || Peacock (4-8) || Wilson (10-9) || || 16,131 || 60–79
|-  style="background:#cfc; text-align:center;"
| 140 || September 3 || Angels || 4–1 || McHugh (8-9) || Weaver (15-8) || Qualls (17) || 16,949 || 61–79
|-  style="background:#cfc; text-align:center;"
| 141 || September 5 || @ Athletics || 4–3 || Oberholtzer (5-10) || Samardzija (4-5) || Sipp (3) || 21,130 || 62–79
|-  style="background:#fcc; text-align:center;"
| 142 || September 6 || @ Athletics || 3–4 || Gregerson (4-3) || Qualls (1-5) || || 28,668 || 62–80
|-  style="background:#cfc; text-align:center;"
| 143 || September 7 || @ Athletics || 4–3 || Veras (4-0) || Cook (1-3) || Fields (3) || 25,533 || 63–80
|-  style="background:#fcc; text-align:center;"
| 144 || September 8 || @ Mariners || 1–4 || Farquhar (3-1) || Foltynewicz (0-1) || Rodney (44) || 15,617 || 63–81
|-  style="background:#cfc; text-align:center;"
| 145 || September 9 || @ Mariners || 2–1 || McHugh (9-9) || Medina (4-3) || Fields (4) || 11,345 || 64–81
|-  style="background:#cfc; text-align:center;"
| 146 || September 10 || @ Mariners || 5–2 || Tropeano (1-0) || Iwakuma (14-7) || Sipp (4) || 16,931 || 65–81
|-  style="background:#fcc; text-align:center;"
| 147 || September 12 || @ Angels || 3–11 || Wilson (12-9) || Oberholtzer (5-11) || || 33,339 || 65–82
|-  style="background:#fcc; text-align:center;"
| 148 || September 13 || @ Angels || 2–5 || Weaver (17-8) || Feldman (8-11) || Street (38) || 38,041 || 65–83
|-  style="background:#cfc; text-align:center;"
| 149 || September 14 || @ Angels || 6–1 || Keuchel (11-9) || Santiago (5-8) || || 35,364 || 66–83
|-  style="background:#cfc; text-align:center;"
| 150 || September 15 || Indians || 3–1 || McHugh (10-9) || McAllister (3-7) || Qualls (18) || 17,403 || 67–83
|-  style="background:#fcc; text-align:center;"
| 151 || September 16 || Indians || 2–4 || Kluber (16-9) || Tropeano (1-1) || Allen (22) || 18,381 || 67–84
|-  style="background:#fcc; text-align:center;"
| 152 || September 17 || Indians || 0–2 || Carrasco (8-5) || Oberholtzer (5-12) || || 18,474 || 67–85
|-  style="background:#fcc; text-align:center;"
| 153 || September 18 || Indians || 1–2 (13) || Crockett (4-0) || Deduno (2-6) || Allen (23) || 16,417 || 67–86
|-  style="background:#fcc; text-align:center;"
| 154 || September 19 || Mariners || 5–10 || Walker (2-2) || Peacock (4-9) || || 27,568 || 67–87
|-  style="background:#cfc; text-align:center;"
| 155 || September 20 || Mariners || 10–1 || Keuchel (12-9) || Young (12-9) || || 36,525 || 68–87
|-  style="background:#cfc; text-align:center;"
| 156 || September 21 || Mariners || 8–3 || McHugh (11-9) || Iwakuma (14-9) || || 31,466 || 69–87
|-  style="background:#fcc; text-align:center;"
| 157 || September 22 || @ Rangers || 3–4 || Holland (2-0) || Tropeano (1-2) || Feliz (12) || 28,717 || 69–88
|-  style="background:#fcc; text-align:center;"
| 158 || September 23 || @ Rangers || 1–2 || Martinez (5-11) || Oberholtzer (5-13) || Cotts (2) || 29,794 || 69–89
|-  style="background:#fcc; text-align:center;"
| 159 || September 24 || @ Rangers || 1–5 || Bonilla (3-0) || Feldman (8-12) || || 28,003 || 69–90
|-  style="background:#cfc; text-align:center;"
| 160 || September 26 || @ Mets || 3–1 || Chapman (2-0) || Torres (8-6) || Qualls (19) || 27,729 || 70–90
|-  style="background:#fcc; text-align:center;"
| 161 || September 27 || @ Mets || 1–2 || Sipp (4-3) || Mejía (6-6) || || 34,866 || 70–91
|-  style="background:#fcc; text-align:center;"
| 162 || September 28 || @ Mets || 3–8 || Colón (15–13)||Tropeano (1–3) || ||34,897 || 70–92
|-

|- style="text-align:center;"
| Legend:       = Win       = Loss       = PostponementBold = Astros team member

Roster

Player stats

Note: All batting and pitching leaders in each category are in bold.

Batting
Note: G = Games played; AB = At bats; R = Runs scored; H = Hits; 2B = Doubles; 3B = Triples; HR = Home runs; RBI = Runs batted in; BB = Base on balls;   AVG = Batting average; SB = Stolen bases

Pitching
Note: W = Wins; L = Losses; ERA = Earned run average; G = Games pitched; GS = Games started; SV = Saves; IP = Innings pitched; H = Hits allowed; R= Runs allowed; ER = Earned runs allowed; HR = Home runs allowed; BB = Walks allowed;  SO = Strikeouts

Farm system

LEAGUE CHAMPIONS: Lancaster

References

External links

2014 Houston Astros season official site 
2014 Houston Astros season at Baseball Reference

Houston Astros seasons
Houston Astros
2014 in sports in Texas